Ilaria Bianchi (born 6 January 1990) is a female Italian olympic swimmer.

Biography

Ilaria Bianchi participated at the 2008 Summer Olympics, she qualified for her second Olympic appearance in London 2012 and third in Rio de Janeiro 2016.  At all three Olympics, she competed in the 100 m butterfly and 4 x 100 m medley relay.  Her best result in the individual was 5th at the 2012 Summer Olympics, while the Italian 4 x 100 m medley relay team finished in 8th at the 2016 Olympics. She competed at the 2020 Summer Olympics, in 100 m butterfly. In 2022 European Aquatics championships, she came 4th in team competition.

See also
Italy at the 2008 Summer Olympics - Swimming
Italy at the 2012 Summer Olympics - Swimming
Italy at the 2016 Summer Olympics - Swimming

References

External links

Ilaria Bianchi at CONI website
Ilaria Bianchi at Nuoto Club Azzurra 91 website
Ilaria Bianchi at FIN website

1990 births
Italian female medley swimmers
European Aquatics Championships medalists in swimming
Italian female butterfly swimmers
Living people
Medalists at the FINA World Swimming Championships (25 m)
Olympic swimmers of Italy
Swimmers at the 2008 Summer Olympics
Swimmers at the 2012 Summer Olympics
Swimmers at the 2016 Summer Olympics
Mediterranean Games gold medalists for Italy
Mediterranean Games bronze medalists for Italy
Swimmers at the 2013 Mediterranean Games
Swimmers of Fiamme Azzurre
People from Castel San Pietro Terme
Mediterranean Games medalists in swimming
Swimmers at the 2020 Summer Olympics
Sportspeople from the Metropolitan City of Bologna
20th-century Italian women
21st-century Italian women
Swimmers at the 2022 Mediterranean Games